The 2009 New Zealand Women's Rugby Competition was a provincial rugby competition, that was played between six women's rugby teams representing 6 different regions of New Zealand. There was a 5-week round-robin running from 22 August to 19 September followed by two semi-finals on 26 September and a grand final on 3 October. The Rugby Union Bonus Points System was used to determine which teams will go on to the finals. Auckland were crowned champions for the second year in a row when they beat Canterbury 24–20.

Standings

The top four teams in pool play will advance to the Semi-finals.

Round-Robin
The 2009 Women's Round Robin ran from 22 August to 19 September. Each team played the other teams once with each team having 2 or 3 home games.

Round 1

Round 2

Round 3

Round 4

Round 5

Finals
The finals will run over two weeks with the first week being to semifinals and the grand final a week later.

Semifinals
The two semifinals were held on 26 September. Canterbury comfortably beat Hawke's Bay, 55 - 3 while Auckland beat Wellington 19 points to 3.

Grand Final
The 2009 New Zealand Women's Rugby Grand Final was played on 3 October when Canterbury who went undefeated throughout the round-robin lost to Auckland at Rugby Park in Christchurch 24–20.
A time is yet to be specified.

See also
 Air New Zealand Cup
 2009 Air New Zealand Cup
 2009 Air New Zealand Cup Round-Robin
 Heartland Championship
 2009 Heartland Championship

References 

Women
Women's rugby union competitions in New Zealand
NZ 4
2009 in women's rugby union
Rugby union competitions for provincial teams
rugby union